The culture of Poland is the product of its geography and distinct historical evolution, which is closely connected to an intricate thousand-year history. Polish culture forms an important part of western civilization and the western world, with significant contributions to art, music, philosophy, mathematics, science, politics and literature.

Its unique character developed as a result of its geography at the confluence of various European regions. It is theorised and speculated that ethnic Poles and the other Lechites (Kashubians and Silesians) are the combination of descendants of West Slavs and people indigenous to the region including Celts, Balts and Germanic tribes which were gradually Polonized after Poland's Christianization by the Catholic Church in the 10th century. Over time Polish culture has been profoundly influenced by its interweaving ties with the Germanic, Baltic, Latinate and to a lesser extent; Byzantine and Ottoman cultures as well as in continual dialogue with the many other ethnic groups and minorities living in Poland.

The people of Poland have traditionally been seen as hospitable to artists from abroad and eager to follow cultural and artistic trends popular in other countries. In the 19th and 20th centuries, the Polish focus on cultural advancement often took precedence over political and economic activity. These factors have contributed to the versatile nature of Polish art, with all its complex nuances. Nowadays, Poland is a highly developed country that retains its traditions.

The term which defines an individual's appreciation of Polish culture and customs is Polonophilia.

History 

Cultural history of Poland can be traced back to the Middle Ages. In its entirety, it can be divided into the following historical, philosophical artistic periods: Culture of medieval Poland (from the late 10th to late 15th century), Renaissance (late 15th to the late 16th century), Baroque (late 16th to the mid-18th century), Enlightenment (second half of the 18th century), Romanticism (from around 1820 until the suppression of the 1863 January uprising against the Russian Empire), Positivism (lasting until the turn of the 20th century), Young Poland (between 1890 and 1918), Interbellum (1918–1939), World War II (1939–1945), People's Republic of Poland (until the 1989 Autumn of Nations), and Modern.

Language 

Polish (język polski, polszczyzna) is a language of the Lechitic subgroup of West Slavic languages (also spelled Lechitic) composed of Polish, Kashubian, Silesian and its archaic variant Slovincian, and the extinct Polabian language. All these languages except Polish are sometimes classified as a Pomeranian subgroup. The West Slavic Languages are a subfamily of the Slavic Languages, a descendant of the Indo-European Languages. In the early Middle Ages, before their speakers had become Germanized, Pomeranian languages and dialects were spoken along the Baltic in an area extending from the lower Vistula River to the lower Oder River." used throughout Poland (being that country's official language) and by Polish minorities in other countries. Its written standard is the Polish alphabet, which corresponds to the Latin alphabet with several additions. Despite the pressure of non-Polish administrations in Poland, who have often attempted to suppress the Polish language, a rich literature has developed over the centuries. The language is currently the largest, in speakers, of the West Slavic group. It is the second most widely spoken Slavic language, after Russian and ahead of Ukrainian. Polish is mainly spoken in Poland. Poland is one of the most linguistically homogeneous European countries; nearly 97% of Poland's citizens declare Polish as their mother tongue.

Philosophy 

Polish philosophy drew upon the broader currents of European philosophy, and in turn contributed to their growth. Among the most momentous Polish contributions were made, in the 13th century, by the Scholastic philosopher and scientist Vitello, by Paweł Włodkowic—in early 15th and, by the Renaissance polymath Nicolaus Copernicus in the 16th century.

Subsequently, the Polish–Lithuanian Commonwealth partook in the intellectual ferment of the Enlightenment, which for the multi-ethnic Commonwealth ended not long after the partitions and political annihilation that would last for the next 123 years, until the collapse of the three partitioning empires in World War I.

The period of Messianism, between the November 1830 and January 1863 Uprisings, reflected European Romantic and Idealist trends, as well as a Polish yearning for political resurrection. It was a period of maximalist metaphysical systems.

The collapse of the January 1863 Uprising prompted an agonising reappraisal of Poland's situation. Poles gave up their earlier practice of "measuring their goals by their aspirations" (Adam Mickiewicz) and buckled down to hard work and study. "[A] Positivist," wrote the novelist Bolesław Prus's friend, Julian Ochorowicz, was "anyone who bases assertions on verifiable evidence; who does not express himself categorically about doubtful things, and does not speak at all about those that are inaccessible."

The 20th century brought a new quickening to Polish philosophy. There was growing interest in western philosophical currents. Rigorously trained Polish philosophers made substantial contributions to specialized fields—to psychology, the history of philosophy, the theory of knowledge, and especially mathematical logic. Jan Łukasiewicz gained world fame with his concept of many-valued logic and his "Polish notation." Alfred Tarski's work in truth theory won him world renown.

After World War II, for over four decades, world-class Polish philosophers and historians of philosophy such as Władysław Tatarkiewicz continued their work, often in the face of adversities occasioned by the dominance of a politically enforced official philosophy. The phenomenologist Roman Ingarden did influential work in esthetics and in a Husserl-style metaphysics; his student Karol Wojtyła owned a unique influence on the world stage as Pope John Paul II.

Cuisine 

Polish foods include kiełbasa, pierogi (filled with meat, potatoes, cabbage, cheese or holiday fruits), pyzy (meat-filled dough balls), kopytka, gołąbki (meat and rice stuffed cabbage), śledzie (herring), bigos, schabowy, oscypek and much more. Traditionally, food such as soups flaki, rosół, zupa ogórkowa, zupa grzybowa (mushroom soup), żurek, zupa pomidorowa (tomato soup) have been prepared in large vessels intended for groups, often necessitating the use of devices such as oars in their preparation. Traditionally, hospitality is very important.

In the Middle Ages, as the cities of Poland grew larger in size and the food markets developed, the culinary exchange of ideas progressed & people got acquainted with new dishes and recipes. Some regions became well known for the type of sausage they made and many sausages of today still carry those original names. The peasants acknowledged their honorable judgment, allowing them to maintain nourished for longer periods of time.

The most important drink is vodka. The first known written mention of the drink was in 1405 in Akta Grodzkie, the court documents from the Palatinate of Sandomierz in Poland. At the time, the word vodka (wódka), referred to chemical compounds such as medicines and cosmetics' cleansers, while the popular beverage was called gorzałka (from the Old Polish gorzeć meaning to burn), which is also the source of Ukrainian horilka (горілка). The word vodka written in Cyrillic appeared first in 1533, in relation to a medicinal drink brought from Poland to Russia by the merchants of Kievan Rus'.

According to a 2009 Ernst & Young report, Poland is Europe's third largest beer producer: Germany with 103 million hectolitres, UK with 49.5 million hl, Poland with 36.9 million hl. Following consecutive growth in the home market, Polish Union of the Brewing Industry Employers (Związek Pracodawców Przemysłu Piwowarskiego), which represents approximately 90% of the Polish beer market, announced during the annual brewing industry conference that consumption of beer in 2008 rose to 94 litres per capita, or 35,624 million hectolitres sold on domestic market. Statistically, a Polish consumer drinks some 92 litres of beer a year, which places it a third behind Germany. Drinking beer as a basic drink was typical during the Middle Ages. Wine is recently becoming more popular. In fact, Polish mead, a honey wine was a traditional drink dating back also to the Middle Ages.

Soft drinks include "napoje gazowane" (carbonated drinks), "napoje bezalkoholowe" (non-alcoholic drinks) like water, tea, juice, coffee or kompot. Kompot is a non-alcoholic beverage made of boiled fruit, optionally with sugar and spices (clove or cinnamon), served hot or cold. It can be made of one type of fruit or a mixture, including apples, peaches, pears, strawberries or sour cherries. Also, Susz is type of kompot made with dried fruits, most commonly apples, apricots, figs. Traditionally served on Christmas Eve.

Among holiday meals, there is a traditional Christmas Eve supper called Wigilia. Another special occasion is Fat Thursday ("Tłusty Czwartek"), a Catholic feast celebrated on the last Thursday before the Lent. Traditionally it is a day when people eat large amounts of sweets and cakes that are afterwards forbidden until Easter day (see also: the Polish traditional Easter Breakfast).

Architecture 

Polish cities and towns reflect the whole spectrum of European styles. Poland's (along with Hungary's) eastern frontiers used to mark the outermost boundary of the influences of Western architecture on the continent.

History has not been good to Poland's architectural monuments. However, ancient structures have survived: castles, churches, and stately buildings, often unique in the regional or European context. Some of them have been painstakingly restored, like Wawel Castle, or completely reconstructed after being destroyed in the Second World War, including the Old Town and Royal Castle in Warsaw, as well as the Old Towns of Gdańsk and Wrocław.

The architecture of Gdańsk is mostly Hanseatic, common in cities along the Baltic Sea and in the northern part of Central Europe. The architectural style of Wrocław is representative of German architecture, since it was a part of the German states for centuries. The center of Kazimierz Dolny on the Vistula is a good example of a well-preserved medieval town, also local variation of Renaissance architecture has been developed called Lublin Renaissance it has preserved in Lublin as Lublin Old Town and Old City of Zamość in Zamość.  Poland's ancient capital, Kraków, ranks among the best-preserved Gothic and Renaissance urban complexes in Europe. Meanwhile, the legacy of the Kresy Marchlands of Poland's eastern regions with Wilno and Lwów (now Vilnius and Lviv) as two major centres for the arts played a special role in these developments with Roman-Catholic church architecture deserving special attention. In Vilnius (Lithuania) there are about forty baroque and Renaissance churches. In Lviv (Ukraine) there are Gothic, Renaissance, and baroque urban churches with influences of the orthodox and Armenian church.

One of the best-preserved examples of the Modernist architecture in Europe is located in Katowice, Upper Silesia, designed and built in the 1930s. Interesting buildings were also constructed during the Communist era in the style of Socialist Realism; some remarkable examples of modern architecture were erected more recently.

Art 

Polish art has always reflected European trends while maintaining its unique character. The Kraków school of Historicist painting developed by Jan Matejko produced monumental portrayals of customs and significant events in Polish history. Stanisław Witkiewicz was an ardent supporter of Realism in Polish art, its main representative being Jozef Chełmoński. 

The Młoda Polska (Young Poland) movement witnessed the birth of modern Polish art and engaged in a great deal of formal experimentation led by Jacek Malczewski (Symbolism), Stanisław Wyspiański, Józef Mehoffer, and a group of Polish Impressionists. Artists of the 20th century Avant-garde represented various schools and trends. The art of Tadeusz Makowski was influenced by Cubism; while Władysław Strzemiński and Henryk Stażewski worked within the Constructivist idiom. Distinguished contemporary artists include Monika Sosnowska, Roman Opałka, Leon Tarasewicz, Jerzy Nowosielski, Mirosław Bałka, and Katarzyna Kozyra and Alicja Kwade in the younger generation. The most celebrated Polish sculptors include Xawery Dunikowski, Katarzyna Kobro, Alina Szapocznikow and Magdalena Abakanowicz. Since the inter-war years, Polish art and documentary photography has enjoyed worldwide recognition. In the 1960s, the Polish Poster School was formed, with Henryk Tomaszewski and Waldemar Świerzy at its head.

Music 

Artists from Poland, including famous composers like Karol Lipiński, Frédéric Chopin or Witold Lutosławski and traditional, regionalised folk musicians, create a lively and diverse music scene, which even recognizes its own music genres, such as sung poetry. Today in Poland, one may find trance, techno, house music, and heavy metal.

The origin of Polish music can be traced as far back as the 13th century, from which manuscripts have been found in Stary Sącz, containing polyphonic compositions related to the Parisian Notre Dame School. Other early compositions, such as the melody of Bogurodzica, may also date back to this period. The first known notable composer, however, Mikołaj z Radomia, lived in the 15th century. The melody of Bóg się rodzi by an unknown composer was a coronation polonaise for Polish kings.

During the 16th century, mostly two musical groups – both based in Kraków and belonging to the King and Archbishop of Wawel – led the rapid innovation of Polish music. Composers writing during this period include Wacław z Szamotuł, Mikołaj Zieleński, and Mikołaj Gomółka. Diomedes Cato, a native-born Italian who lived in Kraków from about the age of five, became one of the most famous lutenists at the court of Sigismund III. He imported some of the musical styles from southern Europe and blended them with native folk music.

Among the best classical modern composers are Polish musicians Grażyna Bacewicz, Witold Lutosławski, Krzysztof Penderecki and Henryk Górecki.

The Polish world renown virtuosos of classical music of all time include composers Karol Lipiński, Artur Rubinstein, Ignacy Paderewski, Mieczysław Horszowski, Grażyna Bacewicz, Wanda Wilkomirska and Krystian Zimerman.

Jazz musician Krzysztof Komeda was known after WWII especially for his film soundtracks, including film directed by Roman Polański, but also for his 1966 album Astigmatic.

Іn thе Роlіѕh muѕіс іnduѕtrу Rар ѕtаnd оut аѕ thе mоѕt рrоmіnеnt аnd wіdеlу rесоgnіzеd gеnrе‌. Роlіѕh rарреrѕ аrе сеlеbrаtеd fоr thеіr tаlеntѕ аnd асhіеvеmеntѕ‌. Оvеr thе уеаrѕ, mоѕt Роlіѕh rарреrѕ ѕtuсk tо thе соntеmроrаrу rар muѕіс, but іn thе 21ѕt сеnturу ѕеvеrаl nеw‐gеnеrаtіоn аrtіѕtѕ bеgаn tо dіvеrѕіfу іntо оthеr gеnrеѕ іnсludіng Тrар‌. Νоtаblе Роlіѕh rарреrѕ іnсludе Magik, Peja and Popek‌. Whіlе іn tеrmѕ оf Rар thеrе аrе mаnу fеmаlе аrtіѕt but nоnе gаіnеd mаіnѕtrеаm рublісіtу‌.

Poland has one of the strongest and best-respected electronic dance music (EDM) scenes in Europe. One of the biggest record labels of EDM in Poland is Empire Records. The death metal band Vader is considered the most successful Polish Metal act and have gained commercial and critical praise internationally. Their career spans more than three decades with many international tours. They are often seen as a huge inspiration on modern Death Metal. Behemoth and Decapitated have found significant success inside and outside Poland. Both have toured extensively across Europe, America and, in the case of Decapitated, have recently toured Australia and New Zealand. Recently Indukti, Hate, Trauma, Crionics, Lost Soul and Lux Occulta have started to become well known outside of Poland. There is also an active grindcore, and a vigorous black metals scenes as well, the later led by Graveland, Darzamat, Kataxu, Infernal War and Vesania.

Literature 

Since the arrival of Christianity and the subsequent access to Western European civilization, Poles developed a significant literary production in Latin. Conspicuous authors of the Middle Ages are among others Gallus Anonymus, Wincenty Kadłubek and Jan Długosz, an author of the monumental work on the history of Poland. With the arrival of the Renaissance, Poles came under the influence of the artistic patterns of the humanistic style, actively participating in the European issues of that time with their Latin works.

The origins of Polish literature written in Polish go back beyond the 14th century. In the 16th century the poetic works of Jan Kochanowski established him as a leading representative of European Renaissance literature. Baroque and Neo-Classicist belle letters made a significant contribution to the cementing of Poland's peoples of many cultural backgrounds. The early 19th century novel "Manuscrit trouvé à Saragosse" by Count Jan Potocki, which survived in its Polish translation after the loss of the original in French, became a world classic. Wojciech Has's film based on it, a favourite of Luis Buñuel, later became a cult film on university campuses. Poland's great Romantic literature flourished in the 19th century when the country had lost its independence. The poets Adam Mickiewicz, Juliusz Słowacki and Zygmunt Krasiński, the "Three Bards", became the spiritual leaders of a nation deprived of its sovereignty, and prophesied its revival. The novelist Henryk Sienkiewicz, who won the Nobel Prize in 1905, eulogised the historical tradition. It is difficult to grasp fully the detailed tradition of Polish Romanticism and its consequences for Polish literature without a thorough knowledge of Polish history.

In the early 20th century, many outstanding Polish literary works emerged from the new cultural exchange and Avant-Garde experimentation. The legacy of the Kresy marshlands of Poland's eastern regions with Wilno and Lwów (now Vilnius and Lviv) as two major centres for the arts, played a special role in these developments. This was also a region in which Jewish tradition and the mystic movement of Hasidism thrived. The Kresy were a cultural trysting-place for numerous ethnic and national groups whose achievements were inspiring each other. The works of Bruno Schulz, Bolesław Leśmian, and Józef Czechowicz were written there. In the south of Poland, Zakopane was the birthplace of the avant-garde works of Stanisław Ignacy Witkiewicz (Witkacy). And, last but not least, Władysław Reymont was awarded the 1924 Nobel prize in literature for his novel Chłopi (The Peasants).

After the Second World War, many Polish writers found themselves in exile, with many of them clustered around the Paris-based "Kultura" publishing venture run by Jerzy Giedroyc. The group of emigre writers included Witold Gombrowicz, Gustaw Herling-Grudziński, Czesław Miłosz, and Sławomir Mrożek.

Zbigniew Herbert, Tadeusz Różewicz, Czesław Miłosz, and Wisława Szymborska are among the most outstanding 20th century Polish poets, including novelists and playwrights Witold Gombrowicz, Sławomir Mrożek, and Stanisław Lem (science fiction). The long list includes Hanna Krall whose work focuses mainly on the war-time Jewish experience, and Ryszard Kapuściński with books translated into many languages.

See also 

 Religion in Poland
 Education in Poland
 Polish comics
 Timeline of Polish science and technology
 Economy of Poland
 Politics of Poland
Foreign relations of Poland
 Tourism in Poland
Seven Wonders of Poland
World Heritage Sites of Poland
 Sport in Poland
 National costumes of Poland

Polish folk dances
Wigilia
Pasterka
Święconka
Pisanka (Polish)
Easter Monday
Fat Thursday
Name days in Poland
Studniówka
Juwenalia
Zaduszki

Gallery

References

External links 

 Looking at Poland's History Through the Prism of Art
 Polonia Music The world of Polish heritage music!
 Polish Art Center A Treasury of Polish Heritage
 Pigasus Gallery Polish Poster, Music & Film
 Serpent.pl Albums from genre folk/ethno
 Read more about Polish culture at Culture.pl – the online magazine promoting Polish culture abroad, run by the Adam Mickiewicz Institute